James McCourt (8 September 1896–unknown) was a Scottish footballer who played in the Football League for Manchester City and Sheffield United.

References

1896 births
Scottish footballers
Association football midfielders
English Football League players
Third Lanark A.C. players
Sheffield United F.C. players
Manchester City F.C. players
Dykehead F.C. players
Year of death missing